Bicyclus matuta is a butterfly in the family Nymphalidae. It is found in the Democratic Republic of the Congo, Uganda, Rwanda and Burundi.

Subspecies
Bicyclus matuta matuta (Democratic Republic of the Congo: east to Kivu, Uganda: south-west to Kigezi, Rwanda, Burundi)
Bicyclus matutaidjwiensis Condamin, 1965 (Democratic Republic of the Congo: Kwidgwi Island, Lake Kivu)

References

Elymniini
Butterflies described in 1894
Butterflies of Africa